Hijiyama-shita is a Hiroden station (tram stop) on Hiroden Hijiyama Line, located at the foot of Mt. Hijiyama, in Hijiyama-cho, Minami-ku, Hiroshima.

Routes
From Hijiyama-shita Station, there are one of Hiroden Streetcar routes.

 Hiroshima Station - (via Hijiyama-shita) - Hiroshima Port Route

Connections
█ Hijiyama Line

Danbara 1-chome — Hijiyama-shita — Hijiyama-bashi

Around station
Hijiyama Park
Hiroshima City Museum of Contemporary Art
Hiroshima City Manga Library
Hijiyama River

History
Opened on December 27, 1944.

See also

Hiroden Streetcar Lines and Routes

External links
Hiroshima City Museum of Contemporary Art
Hiroshima City Library

Hijiyama-shita Station
Railway stations in Japan opened in 1944